KQEQ (1210 AM) is a South Asian station, focused on the local Indian and Pakistani communities, calling itself "Radio Punjab." On May 27, 2015, Spice Radio purchased the station from RAK Communications for $750,000. The purchase was consummated on November 25, 2015. Licensed to Fowler, California, United States, the station serves the Fresno area.

History
The station went on the air as KLIP in 1962. It broadcast on 1220 kHz after KRDU moved to 1130. Morris Mindel owned the station until his 1977 death; two years later, his estate sold the station to Frontier Communications, Inc. The call letters were changed to KRGO on March 20, 1989.  On April 1, 1995, the station changed its call sign to KQEQ. The Hmong Radio (New Wave Broadcasting) Laotian language and Hmong language programming to serve America's largest Hmong and Laotian community.  In September 2010, it was announced on the radio that the station was going to change to KGED 1680 AM in order to reach Hmong residents of Bakersfield and San Francisco more easily. From 2013–present KQEQ was a Spanish Christian format called Radio Guadalupe La Misionera 1210 AM

References

External links
FCC History Cards for KQEQ

QEQ
Radio stations established in 1962
1962 establishments in California